The 1985 Fiji rugby union tour of Australia was a series of matches played in July–August 1985 in Australia by Fiji national rugby union team.

Results

References

Note

Fiji
tour
Fiji national rugby union team tours
tour
Rugby union tours of Australia